Genevieve Wilhelmina Gaunt (born 13 January 1991) is an English actress and voice over artist known for portraying Pansy Parkinson in Harry Potter and the Prisoner of Azkaban and Wilhelmina "Willow" Moreno Henstridge in The Royals.

Early life
Gaunt was born and raised in London, England, the daughter of Dutch actor Frederik de Groot and British actress Fiona Gaunt. She has two siblings, Elwin and Oliver, and began acting at age 12.

Gaunt attended the Godolphin and Latymer School in London. She graduated with a Double First in English from Newnham College, Cambridge.

Career
Gaunt portrayed Pansy Parkinson in Harry Potter and the Prisoner of Azkaban and Jessica Fuller in The Face of an Angel. She portrayed Princess Isabella in Knightfall in 2019 and Wilhelmina "Willow" Moreno on The Royals from 2015 to 2018.

In 2020 Genevieve narrated The Discomfort of Evening (Winner of the Booker Prize International) and played the lead little boy in Code Name Bananas by David Walliams. Genevieve is the voice of Lady Penelope and Grandma Tracy in Thunderbirds with Jon Culshaw as Parker.
 
In 2022 she led new play Ghosts of the Titanic by Ron Hutchinson at The Park Theatre and Lyric Theatre, Belfast.In 2021 Gaunt produced podcast The Cupid Couch where she interviewed Rose McGowan, Buck Angel and Kathy Lette. It was listed by The Radio Times in their '34 Best Podcasts of 2021'.

In October 2022 she narrated Maggie o'Farrell's novel The Marriage Portrait for which she won the AudioFile Magazine (c)Earphones Award.

Gaunt has written book reviews for The Spectator Magazine.

Filmography

Theatre

Radio

Audiobooks

Audiodrama

Film

Television

Awards
 Sylvia Kristel Award (2015)

References

External links

1991 births
Living people
English film actresses
English television actresses
Actresses from London
Alumni of Newnham College, Cambridge
English people of Dutch descent